Air Fiji was an airline based in Nausori, Fiji. It operated inter-island services to destinations within the Fijian Islands. Its main base was Nausori International Airport, Suva, with a base at Nadi International Airport.

Before being headquartered in Nausori, Air Fiji was headquartered in Suva.

History 
The airline was established in 1967 and started operations on 10 July 1967 as Air Pacific. On 29 March 1971, Air Pacific was renamed Fiji Air and again renamed to Air Fiji in February 1995. It was owned by Aviation Investments (55%), government of Fiji (11%) and other shareholders (34%).

It had 229 employees (at March 2007). Air Fiji suspended operations for two weeks in 2008. Air Fiji ceased operations on 1 May 2009 due to financial issues.

Destinations 
Air Fiji operated the following services (at June 2008):

Fiji
Cicia - Cicia Airport
Gau - Gau Airport
Kadavu - Kadavu Airport
Koro - Koro Airport
Labasa - Labasa Airport
Lakeba - Lakeba Airport
Levuka - Levuka Airfield
Malolo Lailai - Malolo Lailai Airport [occasional charter]
Mana - Mana Island Airport [occasional charter]
Moala - Moala Airport
Nadi - Nadi International Airport (Base)
Nausori - Nausori International Airport (Base)
Rotuma - Rotuma Airport
Savusavu - Savusavu Airport
Taveuni - Matei Airport
Vanuabalavu - Vanuabalavu Airport
 Tuvalu
Funafuti - Funafuti International Airport

Terminated destinations
Fiji
Ba - Ba Airport
Bua - Bua Airport
Deuba - Pacific Harbour Airport
Korolevu - Korolevu Airport
Natadola - Natadola Airport
Ono-i-Lau - Ono-i-Lau Airport
Rabi - Rabi Airport
Saqani - Biaugunu Airport
Vatukoula - Vatukoula Airport
Wakaya Island - Wakaya Island Airport

Fleet 
The Air Fiji fleet included the following aircraft (at December 2008):

References

External links
 

Airlines established in 1995
Airlines disestablished in 2009
Defunct airlines of Fiji
1995 establishments in Fiji
2009 disestablishments in Oceania
1967 establishments in Fiji